Toronto is a city in Woodson County, Kansas, United States, along the Verdigris River.  As of the 2020 census, the population of the city was 206.

History
Toronto was founded in 1869. It was named after the city of Toronto, Ontario. The name is derived from the Mohawk word tkaronto, meaning "place where trees stand in the water", which lies at the meeting of several rivers.

Geography
Toronto is located at  (37.798598, -95.949555).

Climate
The climate in this area is characterized by hot, humid summers and generally mild to cool winters.  According to the Köppen Climate Classification system, Toronto has a humid subtropical climate, abbreviated "Cfa" on climate maps.

Demographics

2010 census
As of the census of 2010, there were 281 people, 149 households, and 72 families residing in the city. The racial makeup of the city was 96.4% White, 1.1% Native American, 0.7% from other races, and 1.8% from two or more races. Hispanic or Latino of any race were 2.5% of the population.

There were 149 households, of which 18.8% had children under the age of 18 living with them, 33.6% were married couples living together, 9.4% had a female householder with no husband present, 5.4% had a male householder with no wife present, and 51.7% were non-families. 45.6% of all households were made up of individuals, and 26.2% had someone living alone who was 65 years of age or older. The average household size was 1.89 and the average family size was 2.63.

The median age in the city was 53.5 years. 17.4% of residents were under the age of 18; 6.2% were between the ages of 18 and 24; 15.6% were from 25 to 44; 32.4% were from 45 to 64; and 28.5% were 65 years of age or older. The gender makeup of the city was 50.9% male and 49.1% female.

2000 census
As of the census of 2000, there were 312 people, 171 households, and 80 families residing in the city. The racial makeup of the city was 97.44% White, 0.64% Native American, and 1.92% from two or more races. Hispanic or Latino of any race were 0.64% of the population.

There were 171 households, out of which 16.4% had children under the age of 18 living with them, 40.9% were married couples living together, 5.8% had a female householder with no husband present, and 53.2% were non-families. 48.5% of all households were made up of individuals, and 28.7% had someone living alone who was 65 years of age or older. The average household size was 1.82 and the average family size was 2.60.

In the city, the population was spread out, with 17.3% under the age of 18, 3.2% from 18 to 24, 15.7% from 25 to 44, 29.5% from 45 to 64, and 34.3% who were 65 years of age or older. The median age was 55 years. For every 100 females, there were 88.0 males. For every 100 females age 18 and over, there were 85.6 males.

The median income for a household in the city was $19,643, and the median income for a family was $26,667. Males had a median income of $23,500 versus $13,929 for females. The per capita income for the city was $14,960. About 12.5% of families and 15.9% of the population were below the poverty line, including 11.5% of those under age 18 and 5.7% of those age 65 or over.

Education
The community is served by Eureka USD 389 public school district.

Toronto High School was closed through school unification. The Toronto High School mascot was Trojans.

Parks and recreation
 Toronto Lake and Cross Timbers State Park

Notable people
 John C. Woods, the hangman at the Nuremberg Trials, is buried in the Toronto Township Cemetery.

References

Further reading

External links
 Toronto - Directory of Public Officials
 Toronto city map, KDOT

Cities in Woodson County, Kansas
Cities in Kansas